Acacias-Embajadores is a station on the Madrid Metro. Line 3 serves Embajadores whilst Line 5 serves Acacias. It is located in fare Zone A. The station offers connection to Cercanías Madrid via Embajadores railway station.

References 

Line 3 (Madrid Metro) stations
Line 5 (Madrid Metro) stations
Railway stations in Spain opened in 1936